Thodi Kodallu is a 1957 Indian Telugu-language drama film directed and edited by Adurthi Subba Rao who co-wrote the script with D. Madhusudhana Rao and Acharya Aatreya. Madhusudhana Rao produced the film under Annapurna Pictures. It stars Savitri and Akkineni Nageswara Rao with music composed by Master Venu. The film is based on Sarat Chandra Chattopadhyay's Bengali novel Nishkriti, and was simultaneously made as the Tamil film Engal Veettu Mahalakshmi (1957); both films were made simultaneously by the same banner and director, and some of the scenes and artists are the same in both versions. Thodi Kodallu won the Certificate of merit for Best Feature Film in Telugu.

Cast

Telugu cast

Tamil cast

Production
The film was produced by D. Madhusudhana Rao under his own banner Annapurna Pictures and was directed by Adurthi Subba Rao, who also did the editing. The story was based on Sharat Chandra Chatterjee's Bengali novel Nishkruti. Dialogues were penned by Sridhar. Cinematography was handled by P. S. Selvaraj. S. Krishna Rao was in charge of art direction while A. K. Chopra handled the choreography. The film was also made in Telugu with the title Thodi Kodallu.

Soundtrack

Music was composed by Master Venu. All the tunes for all the songs for both languages are the same.

Telugu Track List
Thodi Kodallu
Lyrics were penned by Acharya Aatreya, Tapi Dharma Rao, Kosaraju and Sri Sri. Playback singers are Ghantasala, Madhavapeddi Satyam, P. Susheela, Jikki  and K. Rani.

Tamil Track List
Engal Veettu Mahalakshmi
Lyrics were penned by Udumalai Narayana Kavi, A. Maruthakasi and K. S. Gopalakrishnan. Singer is K. A. Thangavelu. Playback singers are Ghantasala, T. M. Soundararajan, Seerkazhi Govindarajan, S. C. Krishnan, P. Susheela, Jikki, T. V. Rathnam and K. Rani.

Awards
 National Film Awards
 1957 - Certificate of Merit for Second Best Feature Film in Telugu

Notes

References

External links
 
 
 Thodi Kodallu review at Cinegoer.com

1950s Telugu-language films
1950s Tamil-language films
Indian multilingual films
1957 films
Indian black-and-white films
Films based on Indian novels
Films based on works by Sarat Chandra Chattopadhyay
Films directed by Adurthi Subba Rao
Best Telugu Feature Film National Film Award winners
1950s multilingual films
Films scored by Master Venu